Svenska Cupen 1993–94 was the thirty-ninth season of the main Swedish football Cup. The competition started on 29 April 1993 and was concluded on 12 May 1994 with the Final held in Gamla Ullevi, Göteborg. IFK Norrköping won 4–3 (golden goal) against Helsingborgs IF before an attendance of 4,021 spectators.

Preliminary round 1

For other results see SFS-Bolletinen - Matcher i Svenska Cupen.

Preliminary round 2

For other results see SFS-Bolletinen - Matcher i Svenska Cupen.

First round

For other results see SFS-Bolletinen - Matcher i Svenska Cupen.

Second round

For other results see SFS-Bolletinen - Matcher i Svenska Cupen.

Third round

For other results see SFS-Bolletinen - Matcher i Svenska Cupen.

Fourth round

For other results see SFS-Bolletinen - Matcher i Svenska Cupen.

Fifth round
The 8 matches in this round were played between 22 and 30 September 1993.

Quarter-finals
The 4 matches in this round were played between 6 and 20 October 1993.

Semi-finals
The semi-finals were played on 27 and 28 April 1994.

Final
The final was played on 12 May 1994 in Göteborg.

Footnotes

References 

Svenska Cupen seasons
Cupen
Cupen
Sweden